Purification through Violence is the debut studio album by American death metal band Dying Fetus, following Infatuation with Malevolence, a collection of early demos. It was released in 1996.

The band left Pulverizer Records shortly after the album's release.

Release history
Purification Through Violence was reissued in January 2011 by Relapse. It included the bonus tracks "Beaten into Submission" (1997 rehearsal demo) and "Raped on the Altar" (live in Herbolzheim, Germany, 1998).

Track listing

Personnel
 John Gallagher - guitars/vocals 
 Jason Netherton - bass guitar/vocals 
 Brian Latta - guitars 
 Rob Belton - drums

References

1996 debut albums
Dying Fetus albums